Arkady is a Slavic masculine given name, ultimately derived from the Greek name Αρκάδιος, meaning “from Arcadia”. The Latin equivalent is Arcadius. Notable people with the name include:

People:
Arkady Andreasyan (born 1947), Armenian former football player and manager
Arkadios Dimitrakopoulos (1824-1908), Greek merchant 
Arcady Aris (1901–1942), Chuvash writer
Arkady Averchenko (1881–1925), Russian playwright and satirist
Arkady Babchenko (born 1977), Russian journalist
Arcady Boytler (1895–1965), Russian Mexican filmmaker
Arkady Mikhailovich Chernetsky (born 1950), mayor of Yekaterinburg, Sverdlovsk Oblast, Russia as of 2007
Arkady Chernyshev (1914–1992), Soviet ice hockey and soccer player
Arkady Fiedler (1894–1985), Polish writer, journalist and adventurer
Arkady Filippenko (1912–1983), Soviet Ukrainian composer
Arkady Gaidar (1904–1941), Soviet writer whose stories were very popular among Soviet children
Arkady Kots (1872–1943), Russian proletarian poet of Jewish descent
Arkady Luxemburg, Moldovan composer
Arkady Malov (1928–1995), Chuvash poet and translator
Arkady Migdal (1911–1991), Soviet physicist, member of the USSR Academy of Sciences
Arkady Mordvinov (1896–1964), Soviet architect and construction manager
Arkady Nebolsin (1865-1917), Russian admiral
Arkady Plastov (1893–1972), Russian social realist painter
Arkady Pogodin (1901–1975), Soviet singer
Arkady Raikin (1911–1987), Soviet stand up comedian of Jewish descent
Arcady Ruderman (1950–1992), Belarusian documentary filmmaker
Arkady Rylov (1870–1939), Russian and Soviet Symbolist painter
Arkady Shevchenko (1930–1998), Ukrainian Soviet diplomat who defected to the West
Arkady Sobolev (1903–1964), Russian Soviet diplomat and ambassador to the United Nations
Arkady Strugatsky (1925–1991), Soviet Russian science fiction author
Arkady Ter-Tadevosyan (1939–2021), military leader of the Armenian forces during the Nagorno-Karabakh War
Arkady Ukupnik (born 1953), Russian composer, pop singer, actor and producer.
Arcadi Volodos (born 1972), Russian pianist
Arkady Volsky (1932–2006), Russian politician
Arkady Vorobyov (born 1924), Russian Soviet middle-heavyweight weightlifter
Arkady Vyatchanin (born 1984), Russian swimmer who competes in the backstroke events
Arcady Zhukov, Russian scientist

Fictional characters:
Arkady Bogdanov, engineer and political figure in Kim Stanley Robinson's Mars trilogy
Arkady Darell, teenage heroine in Isaac Asimov's Foundation series
Arkady Dolgoruky, teenage hero in Fyodor Dostoyevsky's novel The Raw Youth
Arkady Ivanovich, in the TV series The Americans
Arkady Kirilenko, antagonist in the video game Battlefield: Bad Company 2
Arkady Kirsanov, in Ivan Turgenev's novel Fathers and Sons
 Arkady Kolcheck, a recurring character in the American TV series NCIS: Los Angeles
Arkady Grigorovich Ourumov, a Russian general who's secretly a henchman of the Janus crime syndicate in the 1995 James Bond film GoldenEye
Arkady Renko, fictional detective, central character of seven novels by the American writer Martin Cruz Smith
Omega Red (Arkady Rossovich), in comic books published by Marvel Comics
Arkady Ivanovich Svidrigailov, antagonist in Dostoyevsky's novel Crime and Punishment
Arkady, feral dragon, side character in Naomi Novik's book series Temeraire

See also
Arcadia (ancient region), a region in Ancient Greece poetically associated with a tradition of rural, bucolic innocence
Arcadia, a region in modern Greece
ARCADY, traffic modelling software
Arkadi, a former Cretian municipality famous for the Arkadi Monastery
Arkadios II of Cyprus (died 643), Monothelite archbishop of Cyprus
Arkadiy, Russian masculine given name
Arcady (disambiguation), various meanings
Arcadius (disambiguation), various meanings
Arkadiusz (Polish cognate)

Masculine given names
Belarusian masculine given names
Polish masculine given names
Russian masculine given names